The Bertone Genesis or sometimes referred to as the Lamborghini Genesis was a Bertone designed concept car using Lamborghini parts. It was first displayed to the public at the 1988 Turin Auto Show.

The Genesis is a five-door minivan and features gull-wing doors in the front and sliding doors at the back. It was powered by the same  5.2 L V12 engine found in the Lamborghini Countach Quattrovalvole, mated to a 3 speed TorqueFlite automatic transmission sending power to the rear wheels. The Genesis was significantly slower than the Countach though, with a weight of around  combined with the shorter gear ratios from the Chrysler 3-speed transmission. While the LM002 had recently finished production, freeing up potential assembly space for the Genesis, or a vehicle like it, it was never really intended to go beyond the show car design study.

References 

Genesis
Minivans
Automobiles with gull-wing doors